The 2015 Nebelhorn Trophy was a senior international figure skating competition in the 2015–16 season. Part of the 2015–16 ISU Challenger Series, it was held on September 24–26, 2015 at the Eislaufzentrum Oberstdorf. Medals were awarded in men's and ladies' singles, pair skating, and ice dance.

Entries

Results

Men

Ladies

Pairs

Ice dance

External links
 Entries
 2015 Nebelhorn Trophy results
 2015 Nebelhorn Trophy at the DEU website

Nebelhorn Trophy
Nebelhorn
Nebelhorn Trophy